The 2019 Little League World Series was held from August 15 to August 25 at the Little League headquarters complex in South Williamsport, Pennsylvania. Eight teams from the United States and eight teams from around the world competed in the 73rd edition of the Little League World Series. Eastbank Little League of River Ridge, Louisiana defeated Pabao Little League of Willemstad, Curaçao in the championship by a 8–0 score. It was the first championship for a team from Louisiana, and in doing so, they became the first team to win the championship after losing its first game since the tournament expanded to 16 teams in 2001. Also, with Honolulu Little League of Honolulu, Hawaii winning the title in 2018, U.S. teams have now won back-to-back titles for the first time since 2009, when Park View Little League from Chula Vista, California, ended the streak of five straight championships for the United States.

Tournament changes
Among the changes made by the Little League International Board of Directors to the rules, regulations, and policies of Little League was introduction of a rule concerning tied games. Should a game complete seven innings with the score still tied, the offensive team in each subsequent half-inning will start with a runner placed on second base. The runner is the player in the team's batting order who is scheduled to bat last in the half-inning.

Teams

Regional qualifying tournaments were held from June to August 2019.

Results

The draw to determine the opening round pairings took place on June 13, 2019.

United States bracket

International bracket

Consolation games

Teams that lose their first two games get to play a consolation game against a team from the other side of the bracket that also lost its first two games. These games are labeled Game A and Game B.

Third place game

This consolation game is played between the runner-up of the United States championship and the runner-up of the International championship.

World Championship

Champions path
The Eastbank LL reached the LLWS with an undefeated record in nine games. In total, their record was 15–1.

MLB Little League Classic
On August 19, 2018, it was announced that the third MLB Little League Classic would be played on August 18, 2019, at BB&T Ballpark at Historic Bowman Field, featuring the Chicago Cubs and the Pittsburgh Pirates. The Pirates made their second appearance in the annual game, having won the inaugural Classic in 2017. The game was won by the Cubs, 7–1.

References

 
2019
2019 in baseball
2019 in sports in Pennsylvania
August 2019 sports events in the United States